Yantar Seversk is an formerly ice hockey team in Seversk, Russia. They played in the Pervaya Liga, the third level of Russian ice hockey. The club was founded in 1965 and folded in 2014.

External links
Official site

Ice hockey teams in Russia